Päivi Paunu (20 September 1946 – 14 December 2016) was a Finnish singer, born in Helsinki. Paunu and Kim Floor performed in the 1972 Eurovision contest in the United Kingdom with the song "Muistathan" ("I Hope You Remember").

Music career
Päivi Paunu started as a folk singer at mid 60s singing at folk concerts in Helsinki. Asked to make records her first published single was "Aamulla varhain" / "Mene ikkunani luota" in 1966. The first single gained attention as B-side "Mene ikkunani luota" got full points at Levyraati ("Record Panel"). The single was followed by album Päivi Paunu in 1966. She died on 14 December 2016, aged 70, of cancer.

Discography

Albums
 Päivi Paunu, 1966
 Päivi, 1969
 Hei vain, 1971
 Uskon päivään kauniimpaan, 1972
 Huomiseen mä luotan vieläkin, 1973
 Jos rakkaus jää, 1977
 Arkinen hartaus, 1986
 20 suosikkia: Oi niitä aikoja, 1996

References

1946 births
2016 deaths
Singers from Helsinki
20th-century Finnish women singers
Eurovision Song Contest entrants of 1972
Eurovision Song Contest entrants for Finland
Deaths from cancer in Finland